The Indian locomotive class YDM-2 is a class of diesel-Hydraulic  locomotive that was developed in 1986-90 by Chittaranjan Locomotive Works for Indian Railways. The model name stands for Metre gauge (Y), Diesel (D), Mixed traffic (M) engine, 2nd generation (2). They entered service in 1986. A total of 41 YDM-2 locomotives was built between 1986 and 1990.

History
The history of YDM-2 begins in the early 1980s with the stated aim of the Indian Railways to remove steam locomotives from Indian rails after recommendation of Karnail Singh Fuel Committee. Therefore required building a large number of Meter gauge diesel locomotives. Thus Indian Railways began looking at various diesel-electric designs.
These locomotives were designed by CLW for hauling both passenger and freight traffic. They used suri transmission similar to one used in the broad gauged WDM-3. 41 of these locomotives were built and they were initially homed at Moula Ali (MLY) diesel loco shed in Southern Central Railways division (SCR). After Moula Ali line was converted to Broad gauge, these locomotives were transferred to Golden rock(GOC) shed in the Southern Railway Zone. They hauled passenger and goods trains till the late 2000s when the meter gauge lines were converted to broad gauge. All units are now withdrawn from service and all units are believed to be scrapped.

Former sheds 

 Moula Ali (MLY)
 Golden Rock (GOC)
 All the locomotives of this class have been withdrawn from service.

See also 

 IIndian locomotive class YDM-4
 Indian locomotive class WDM-3
 Locomotives of India

References

External links

Diesel-hydraulic locomotives of India
B-B locomotives
Chittaranjan Locomotive Works locomotives
Railway locomotives introduced in 1986
Metre gauge locomotives